Stanton Harcourt is a village and civil parish in Oxfordshire about  southeast of Witney and about  west of Oxford. The 2011 Census recorded the parish's population as 960.

Archaeology
Within the parish of Stanton Harcourt is a series of palaeochannel deposits buried beneath the second (Summertown-Radley) gravel terrace of the River Thames. The deposits have been attributed to Marine isotope stages and have been the subject of archaeological and palaeontological research. Evidence was found for the co-existence of species of elephant and mammoth during interglacial conditions, disproving the widely held view that mammoths were an exclusively cold-adapted species.

Manor
Stanton is derived from the Old English for "farmstead by the stones", probably after the prehistoric stone circle known as the Devil's Quoits, southwest of the village. The site is a scheduled monument.  The Domesday Book of 1086 records that the manor was held by Odo, Bishop of Bayeux. It became Stanton Harcourt after Robert de Harcourt of Bosworth, Leicestershire inherited lands of his father-in-law at Stanton in 1191.

Harcourt House was built for the Harcourt family in the 15th and mid-16th centuries, and its gatehouse was added about 1540. Harcourt House is a Grade II* listed building. Its Great Kitchen was built in 1485, possibly incorporating an earlier building. The kitchen is a separate building from the house and is Grade I listed. The service range attached to the south of the Great Kitchen is also 15th-century. It has been converted into a house, Manor Farmhouse, and is Grade I listed.

Pope's Tower in the grounds of Harcourt House was built about 1470–71, probably by the master mason William Orchard. It is a Grade I listed building. The tower acquired its name centuries later, after the poet Alexander Pope stayed here in 1717–18 and used its upper room to translate the fifth volume of Homer's Iliad. In the summer of 1718 he also wrote the epitaph to a young couple, John Hewett and Sarah Drew, who were struck by lightning and killed in the parish. The poem is carved on a stone monument on the outside of the south wall of the nave or St Michael's parish church.

Parish church

The earliest known record of the Church of England parish church of Saint Michael dates from 1135, and the Norman nave and lower parts of the bell tower are certainly 12th century. In the 13th century the chancel, chancel arch and tower arches were rebuilt and the transepts and stair turret were added. In the 15th century the upper part of the belltower was completed, the Perpendicular Gothic west window of the nave and north and south windows of the transepts were inserted and the pitch of the roof was lowered.  St Michael's is a Grade I listed building.  The central tower has a ring of six bells. Michael Darbie, an itinerant bellfounder, cast the second, third, fourth and fifth bells in 1656, which was during the Commonwealth of England. Richard Keene of Woodstock cast the tenor bell in 1686. Abraham II Rudhall of Gloucester cast the treble bell in 1722.  

In the chancel is the Decorated Gothic late 13th- or early 14th-century shrine of St Edburg of Bicester. It was at the Augustinian priory at Bicester until 1536, when the priory was dissolved. Sir James Harcourt had the shrine salvaged and moved to St Michael's.  The Harcourt chapel was added on the south side of the chancel, possibly by William Orchard. It includes the medieval tombs of Sir Thomas Harcourt and his wife, Lady Maud, daughter of Lord Grey of Rotherfield.  St Michael's parish is part of the Benefice of Lower Windrush, along with the parishes of Northmoor, Standlake and Yelford.

RAF Stanton Harcourt

In the Second World War there was a Royal Air Force airfield at Stanton Harcourt. The runways are, for the most part, now gone, but some of the original buildings remain including a turret trainer, crew room and various other buildings. The hangars have been converted into office and industrial units.

Amenities

Stanton Harcourt has a 17th-century pub, The Harcourt Arms,. It had another pub, the Fox, but it is now a private home. The parish council owns Fox Field behind it and has renamed it the Jubilee Field, with installed play equipment. Trees and hedging have been provided by the Woodland Trust and planted by volunteers.  The village has a primary school. Currently there is no bus service to the village. Stanton Harcourt has a history of Morris dancing since the 19th century. Following a lapse, the traditional dances have been revived by the Icknield Morris and Trigg Morris, and continue today.

First & Last Mile buses provide a daytime bus service 418 giving a two-hourly service to Standlake, Eynsham, Freeland, and Long Hanborough.

Notable people
Edward Venables-Vernon-Harcourt, who was Archbishop of York 1807–47, is buried here.

References

Sources and further reading

External links

 
 

Civil parishes in Oxfordshire
Villages in Oxfordshire
West Oxfordshire District